"A Little Bit of Love" is a song written by Andreas Johnson and Peter Kvint, and performed by Andreas Johnson at Melodifestivalen 2007. The song participated in the semifinale in Gävle on 24 February 2007, heading directly to the finals inside the Stockholm Globe Arena on 10 March 2007, finishing second. On 5 March 2007 the single was released. The single peaked at third position at the Swedish singles chart, and became a major radio hit both at Sveriges Radio and the commercial stadions.

The song also charted at Svensktoppen, entering the chart on 8 April 2007 on 2nd position. On 15 April 2007 the song topped the chart. On 19 August 2007 the song was at Svensktoppen for 20th and final time. before getting knocked out the upcoming week.

Single track listing
A Little Bit of Love
A Little Bit of Love (PJ Harmony Remix Version)

Charts

References 

2007 singles
2007 songs
Andreas Johnson songs
English-language Swedish songs
Melodifestivalen songs of 2007
Songs written by Peter Kvint
Songs written by Andreas Johnson
Warner Music Group singles